The men's singles luge competition at the 1998 Winter Olympics in Nagano was held on 8 and 9 February, at Spiral.

Summary 
The event was won by Georg Hackl, who became the first luger to win the gold medal in 3 successive Winter Olympics after winning the event in Albertville and Lillehammer. Armin Zöggeler of Italy took silver and Jens Müller - the bronze medal. Markus Prock, the silver medalist from Lillehammer, finished outside medal position in 4th.

Event schedule 
All times are (UTC+9).

Results

References

Luge at the 1998 Winter Olympics
Luge